In mathematics, a Lie superalgebra is a generalisation of a Lie algebra to include a Z2grading. Lie superalgebras are important in theoretical physics where they are used to describe the mathematics of supersymmetry. In most of these theories, the even elements of the superalgebra correspond to bosons and odd elements to fermions (but this is not always true; for example, the BRST supersymmetry is the other way around).

Definition
Formally, a Lie superalgebra is a nonassociative Z2-graded algebra, or superalgebra, over a commutative ring (typically R or C) whose product [·, ·], called the Lie superbracket or supercommutator, satisfies the two conditions (analogs of the usual Lie algebra axioms, with grading):

Super skew-symmetry:

The super Jacobi identity:

where x, y, and z are pure in the Z2-grading. Here, |x| denotes the degree of x (either 0 or 1). The degree of [x,y] is the sum of degree of x and y modulo 2.

When the ground ring is the integers or the Lie superalgebra is a free module, these conditions are equivalent to the condition that the Poincaré–Birkhoff–Witt theorem holds (and, in general, they are necessary conditions for the theorem to hold).

Just as for Lie algebras, the universal enveloping algebra of the Lie superalgebra can be given a Hopf algebra structure.

A graded Lie algebra (say, graded by Z or N) that is anticommutative and Jacobi in the graded sense also has a  grading (which is called "rolling up" the algebra into odd and even parts), but is not referred to as "super". See note at graded Lie algebra for discussion.

Properties 
Let  be a Lie superalgebra. By inspecting the Jacobi identity, one sees that there are eight cases depending on whether arguments are even or odd. These fall into four classes, indexed by the number of odd elements:

 No odd elements. The statement is just that  is an ordinary Lie algebra.
 One odd element. Then  is a -module for the action .
 Two odd elements. The Jacobi identity says that the bracket  is a symmetric -map.
 Three odd elements. For all , .

Conditions (1)–(3) are linear and can all be understood in terms of ordinary Lie algebras. Condition (4) is nonlinear, and is the most difficult one to verify when constructing a Lie superalgebra starting from an ordinary Lie algebra and a representation.

Involution
A ∗ Lie superalgebra is a complex Lie superalgebra equipped with an involutive antilinear map from itself to itself which respects the Z2 grading and satisfies
[x,y]* = [y*,x*] for all x and y in the Lie superalgebra. (Some authors prefer the convention [x,y]* = (−1)|x||y|[y*,x*]; changing * to −* switches between the two conventions.) Its universal enveloping algebra would be an ordinary *-algebra.

Examples
Given any associative superalgebra  one can define the supercommutator on homogeneous elements by

and then extending by linearity to all elements. The algebra  together with the supercommutator then becomes a Lie superalgebra. The simplest example of this procedure is perhaps when  is the space of all linear functions  of a super vector space  to itself. With the Lie bracket per above, the space is denoted .

The Whitehead product on homotopy groups gives many examples of Lie superalgebras over the integers.

The super-Poincaré algebra generates the isometries of flat superspace.

Classification

The simple complex finite-dimensional Lie superalgebras were classified by Victor Kac.

They are (excluding the Lie algebras):

The special linear lie superalgebra .

The lie superalgebra  is the subalgebra of  consisting of matrices with super trace zero. It is simple when . If , then the identity matrix generates an ideal.

The orthosymplectic Lie superalgebra .

The exceptional Lie superalgebra .

There is a family of (9∣8)-dimensional Lie superalgebras depending on a parameter .

The exceptional Lie superalgebra .

It has dimension (24|16).

The exceptional Lie superalgebra .

It has dimension (17|14).

The Cartan types. For the Cartan type of simple Lie superalgebras, the odd part is no longer completely reducible under the action of the even part.

Classification of infinite-dimensional simple linearly compact Lie superalgebras
The classification consists of the 10 series W(m, n), S(m, n) ((m, n) ≠ (1, 1)), H(2m, n), K(2m + 1, n), HO(m, m) (m ≥ 2), SHO(m, m) (m ≥ 3), KO(m, m + 1), SKO(m, m + 1; β) (m ≥ 2), SHO ∼ (2m, 2m), SKO ∼ (2m + 1, 2m + 3) and the five exceptional algebras:

E(1, 6), E(5, 10), E(4, 4), E(3, 6), E(3, 8)

The last two are particularly interesting (according to Kac) because they have the standard model gauge group SU(3)×SU(2)×U(1) as their zero level algebra. Infinite-dimensional (affine) Lie superalgebras are important symmetries in superstring theory.

Category-theoretic definition

In category theory, a Lie superalgebra  can be defined as a nonassociative superalgebra whose product satisfies

where σ is the cyclic permutation braiding . In diagrammatic form:

See also
 Gerstenhaber algebra
 Anyonic Lie algebra
 Grassmann algebra
 Representation of a Lie superalgebra
 Superspace
 Supergroup
 Universal enveloping algebra

Notes

References

Historical 
.

External links
 Irving Kaplansky + Lie Superalgebras

Supersymmetry
Lie algebras